Martin Bella (born 26 March 1964), nicknamed Munster, is an Australian former rugby league footballer who played in the 1980s and 1990s. A , he represented Queensland and Australia, and played his club football for a number of clubs in Australian and England.

Background
Born in Sarina, Queensland, Bella is of Italian descent and played his junior rugby league for the Sarina Crocs.

Playing career
Bella first came to prominence playing in the Foley Shield competition. A Queensland and Australian Schoolboy representative, his Mackay under-18 team defeated Herbert River in the final and he later represented the North Queensland Marlins. In 1983, Bella left north Queensland to play for the Easts Tigers in Brisbane Rugby League premiership. After three seasons in Brisbane and two off-seasons playing for Halifax in England's Rugby Football League, Bella moved to North Sydney Bears in 1986.

North Sydney Bears
In 1986, Bella played 23 games for the Bears in his first season at the club, starting 19 games at prop. At the end of the season, he went on the 1986 Kangaroo tour of Great Britain and France, playing in most games on the tour, but not the Tests.

In 1987, he made his State of Origin debut for Queensland and played in 23 games for the Bears. In 1988, he again represented Queensland and played his first Test match for Australia, coming off the bench in the Kangaroos' third Test loss to Great Britain on their tour of Australia.

In 1989, Bella played 17 games for the Bears and was named man of the match in Queensland's Game One win over New South Wales. Following the Origin series, in which Queensland won 3–0, Bella was selected for Australia's mid-season tour of New Zealand, though he only played in 3 minor games on tour and failed to make the Test team.

Manly Warringah Sea Eagles
In 1990, Bella joined the Manly Warringah Sea Eagles. He played in 22 games for the Sea Eagles and was named the Dally M Prop of the Year. At the end of the 1990 NSWRL season, he went on the 1990 Kangaroo tour of Great Britain and France. Unfortunately for Bella, he paid the price for Australia's first Ashes series loss to Great Britain at Wembley Stadium and was replaced in the test team by Glenn Lazarus for the remaining tests on the tour.

In 1991, Bella won his second man of the match award in the third and deciding match of the 1991 State of Origin series. After his displays for Queensland, he was recalled to the Australian team for the mid-season 1991 Trans-Tasman Test series against New Zealand. He played his final two Tests during Australia's tour of Papua New Guinea in 1991, played a total of nine Tests for his country.

Canterbury-Bankstown Bulldogs
After three years with the Sea Eagles, Bella joined the Canterbury-Bankstown Bulldogs as one of their key signings along with Jim Dymock and Jim Serdaris for the 1993 season. During the 1993 State of Origin series, Bella memorably played the ball the wrong way after being spun around in a strong tackle. In 1994, he played in Canterbury's Grand Final loss to the Canberra Raiders, where he famously knocked the ball on from the opening kick off.

In all, he played 46 out of a possible 48 games in his two seasons with the Bulldogs - the only two he missed were due to State of Origin duties.

His final season with the Bulldogs coincided with his final of 21 State of Origin games for Queensland.

North Queensland Cowboys
In 1995, Bella decided against retirement and returned to north Queensland, signing with the newly established North Queensland Cowboys. A veteran, representative forward at that stage of his career, Bella was perhaps the club's biggest signing for their first season. On 11 March 1995, Bella started at prop in the Cowboys' inaugural game, a 16–32 loss to the Sydney Bulldogs at Stockland Stadium. Bella played just 14 games for the Cowboys, being released from the club at the back end of the 1995 season due to behavioural issues.

Gold Coast Chargers
Bella considered retirement after his release by the Cowboys but again decided against it, signing with the Gold Coast Chargers in 1996. In two seasons with the club, he played 35 games, including the club's first (and only) finals games in 1997. After 12 seasons and 235 first grade games, he retired from rugby league at the end of the 1997 season.

Achievements and accolades

Individual
Dally M Prop of the Year: 1990

Post-football life
Bella holds a degree in physiotherapy and has run his own practice in the Queensland rural town of Sarina. Since 2016, he has served as a councillor for Mackay Regional Council

Statistics

NSWRL/ARL

State of Origin

Australia

Post-playing career
In 2000, Bella was awarded the Australian Sports Medal for his contribution to Australia's international standing in rugby league. In 2008, Bella was named in the North Queensland rugby league Team of the Century.

Personal life
A qualified physiotherapist, Bella's brothers Robert and Anthony, played first grade for the South Queensland Crushers. Bella's son, Ross, currently plays for the Mackay Cutters in the Queensland Cup and previously played for the Townsville Blackhawks and North Queensland Cowboys under-20 team. His niece, Lauren, plays in the AFLW for the Gold Coast Suns.

References

External links
Bulldogs profile
Martin Bella at Foley Shield fan site
Martin Bella at nqsports.com

1964 births
Living people
Australia national rugby league team players
Australian people of Italian descent
Australian expatriate sportspeople in England
Australian rugby league players
Canterbury-Bankstown Bulldogs players
Eastern Suburbs Tigers players
Gold Coast Chargers players
Halifax R.L.F.C. players
Manly Warringah Sea Eagles players
North Queensland Cowboys players
North Sydney Bears players
Queensland Rugby League State of Origin players
Recipients of the Australian Sports Medal
Rugby league players from Mackay, Queensland
Rugby league props